Feldhahn is a German surname meaning 'field cock'. Notable people with the surname include:

Juanita Feldhahn (born 1973), Australian cyclist
Nicolas Feldhahn (born 1986), German footballer
Shaunti Feldhahn, American writer

See also
Feldbahn

German-language surnames